The third season of the Indonesian reality singing competition The Voice Indonesia premiered on November 1, 2018 on GTV. Ananda Omesh from the Kids' edition came to host the show alongside Astrid Tiar. All coaches from the second season did not return and were then replaced by Armand Maulana, Anggun, Titi DJ, and the first duo coach ever on the show, Anindyo Baskoro and Vidi Aldiano.

Auditions
Contestant auditions were held in these cities:

Coaches and hosts
In August 2018, it was announced that all coaches from the second season Ari Lasso, Akhadi "Kaka" Wira Satriaji, Agnez Mo and Judika would not return and were then replaced by Anggun, Titi DJ, Vidi Aldiano and Anindyo Baskoro. Meanwhile, Armand Maulana, who was in the first season, would return. Daniel Mananta also would not return again as host, and replaced by Ananda Omesh, that hosted this season together with Astrid Tiar.

Teams
Color Key

Blind auditions
Color key

Episode 1 (November 1, 2018)

Episode 2 (November 8, 2018)

Episode 3 (November 15, 2018)

Episode 4 (November 22, 2018)

Episode 5 (November 29, 2018)

Episode 6 (December 6, 2018)

Episode 7 (December 13, 2018)

Episode 8 (December 20, 2018)

Episode 9 (December 27, 2018)

Episode 10 (January 3, 2019)

The Knockouts
The Knockouts will be aired from Thursday, January 10, 2019. At this stage, the coaches can steal two losing artists from another coach.

Color key:

The Battles 
The Battle Rounds started on February 14. The coaches have either one steal and one save or two steals (meaning the coaches can not save twice). The top 32 contestants then moved on to the Live Shows. Advisors for this season are: Maia Estianty working with Team Armand, Melly Goeslaw for Team Anggun, season 1 coach Sherina Munaf helping Team Vidi-Nino, and Indra Lesmana assisting Team Titi.

Color key:

Live Shows 

Color key:

Week 1: Top 32, Group 1 (March 7)

Week 2: Top 32, Group 2 (March 14)

Week 3: Semifinals, Top 16 (March 21)

Week 4: Finals (March 28)

Top 8

Top 4

Elimination Charts

Overall
Color key
Artist's info

 

Result details

Teams
Color key
Artist's info

Results details

See also 
 The Voice Indonesia
 The Voice Indonesia (season 1)
 The Voice Indonesia (season 2)

References

External links
 Official website

2018 Indonesian television seasons
Season 3